Sharad Vir Singh is an Indian politician and a member of 17th Legislative Assembly of Uttar Pradesh of India. He represents the Jalalabad constituency of Uttar Pradesh and is a member of the Bhartiya Janata Party.

Political career
Singh was elected as MLA for the 3rd time in 2017. In 1996 he had won election 1st time and in 2002 he again won the election from jalalabad. In 2007 and 2012 Assembly election he lost with a small margin. 
Singh has been a member of the 17th Legislative Assembly of Uttar Pradesh. Since 2017, he has represents the Jalalabad constituency and is a member of the SP.

Posts held

See also
Uttar Pradesh Legislative Assembly

References

Uttar Pradesh MLAs 2017–2022
Samajwadi Party politicians
Living people
Year of birth missing (living people)
Samajwadi Party politicians from Uttar Pradesh